Oihane Valdezate Cabornero (born 10 April 2000) is a Spanish footballer who plays as a midfielder for Athletic Club.

Club career
Valdezate started her career in the youth system at Pauldarrak (Barakaldo). She joined Athletic Club in 2016 and made her debut for the first team on 13 April 2019, a 1–0 victory against Albacete. In April 2020, she signed a contract extension with Athletic Club, keeping her at the club until 2023. In the 2020–21 season, Valdezate was deployed in a number of different positions, including forward and central defender. Her usual position is midfielder.

References

External links
 
 
 
 

2000 births
Living people
People from Greater Bilbao
Sportspeople from Biscay
Footballers from the Basque Country (autonomous community)
Spanish women's footballers
Women's association football midfielders
Athletic Club Femenino B players
Athletic Club Femenino players
Segunda Federación (women) players
Primera División (women) players
Spain women's youth international footballers